No. 1311 (Transport) Flight was first formed at RAF Llandow on 10 April 1944, equipped with Avro Anson I transport aircraft. The flight was disbanded on 21 July 1944 at RAF Thruxton, absorbed by No. 84 Group RAF's Support Unit. 

1311 Flight was re-formed at RAF Seletar with Auster VI and Pioneer CC.1 liaison aircraft, and dis-banded at Noble Field, Malaya, on 15 February 1954, to become the Supply Flight of No. 267 Squadron RAF.

Representative Aircraft

 Anson I - MG471
 Anson X - NK658
 Auster VI - TW535
 Pioneer CC.1 - XE512

References

Bibliography

1311 Flight
Military units and formations established in 1944
Military units and formations disestablished in 1954